Cha Chol-ma is a North Korean businessman believed to be one of the wealthiest individuals in the country.

Government career
Cha reportedly worked for the Ministry of Foreign Affairs in the past. Cha held senior positions within the Supreme People’s Assembly from 2012 until ~2015-2016.

Business
Cha reportedly monopolized foreign currency businesses run by the Supreme People's Assembly, earning more than US$10,000,000. He has overseen business developments in Pakistan and the People's Republic of China, as well as domestic economic and infrastructure projects.

Family and personal life
Cha is the son-in-law of Ri Je-gang, a North Korean politician close to Kim Jong-il.

References

Members of the Supreme People's Assembly
North Korean businesspeople